Black Witchery is an American blackened death metal band from Winter Springs, Florida.

The band evolved in the mid-1990s after the dissolution of the Irreverent. It was originally known as Witchery, before changing the name to their current name in 1999 due to the Swedish band Witchery already using the name.

History

The band issued a pair of splits and an EP before dropping their debut album, Desecration of the Holy Kingdom, in 2001 through Full Moon Productions. In 2005, they signed with the French independent label Osmose Productions and released their second effort, Upheaval of Satanic Might, followed by a split album with Archgoat, entitled Desecration & Sodomy in 2008, which followed with a European tour of the two bands in 2017.

A live album, Live Desecration Ritual, was released in 2010. Their third full-length Inferno of Sacred Destruction arrived in 2010, followed by the Nuclear War Now! Productions-issued Evil Shall Prevail in 2016, the latter of which compiled tracks from the band's early demos and split EPs, and also included previously unreleased material.

On February 2, 2016, former guitarist Steve "Tregenda" Childers died as a result of a car accident at the age of 49.

Discography

Studio albums
 Desecration of the Holy Kingdom (2001)
 Upheaval of Satanic Might (2005)
 Inferno of Sacred Destruction (2010)

Split albums
 Desecration & Sodomy (with Archgoat) (2008)

Live albums
 Live Descration Ritual (2010)

Compilation albums
 Evil Shall Prevail (2016)

References

American black metal musical groups
Heavy metal musical groups from Florida
Musical groups with year of establishment missing